Harpers Magazine may refer to:
 Harper's Magazine (since 1850), American monthly magazine of literature, politics, culture, finance, and the arts
 Harpers Wine & Spirit, formerly Harpers Magazine, British information service for the wine and spirit industry

See also
 Harper's Bazaar (since 1867), an American women's fashion magazine
 Harper's Weekly (1857–1916), an American political magazine
 Harpers (disambiguation)